The Belarus national under-17 football team is the national under-17 football (soccer) team of Belarus and is controlled by the Football Federation of Belarus.

UEFA European Under-16/Under-17 Football Championship record

Under-16 format

Under-17 format

*Denotes draws include knockout matches decided on penalty kicks.

Current squad
 The following players were called up for the 2023 UEFA European Under-17 Championship qualification matches.
 Match dates: 20-26 October 2022
 Opposition: ,  and 
Caps and goals correct as of: 23 October 2022, after the match against

See also
Belarus national football team
Belarus national under-23 football team
Belarus national under-21 football team
Belarus national under-19 football team

References

Under-17
European national under-17 association football teams